Minuscule 352 (in the Gregory-Aland numbering), ε 123 (Soden), is a Greek minuscule manuscript of the New Testament, on parchment. Paleographically it has been assigned to the 11th century. It has marginalia.

Description 

The codex contains the text of the four Gospels on 219 parchment leaves, with only some lacunae (Matthew 1:1-17; Mark 1:1-15; 16:13-20; Luke 1:1-7; 24:43-53; John 1:1-9; 21:3-25). The text is written in one column per page, in 20 lines per page.

There is also a division according to the smaller Ammonian Sections, but it was added by a later hand. It contains lectionary markings at the margin.

Text 

The Greek text of the codex is a representative of the Byzantine text-type. Hermann von Soden classified it to the textual family Kx. Aland placed it in Category V.
According to the Claremont Profile Method it represents textual family Kx in Luke 1, Luke 10, and Luke 20, and creates cluster 352.

It is close to minuscule 375.

History 
Hug and Gregory dated the manuscript to the 11th century. Currently it is dated by the INTF to the 11th century.

The manuscript was brought from Calabria in 1607. It was examined and described by Johann Leonhard Hug and Scholz. It was added to the list of New Testament manuscripts by Scholz (1794-1852).
C. R. Gregory saw the manuscript in 1886.

The manuscript is currently housed at the Biblioteca Ambrosiana (B. 93 sup.) in Milan.

See also 

 List of New Testament minuscules
 Biblical manuscript
 Textual criticism

References

Further reading 

 J. M. A. Scholz, Biblisch-kritische Reise (Leipzig, 1823), p. 70-73.
 Catalogus graecorum Bibliothecace Ambrosianae (Mediolani 1906), vol. I, pp. 126–127.

Greek New Testament minuscules
11th-century biblical manuscripts
Manuscripts of the Ambrosiana collections